Tamarite de Litera, is the first major town of the comarca of La Litera in the province of Huesca, Aragon, Spain. According to the 2014 census, the municipality has a population of 14,926 inhabitants. It is the capital of the comarca of La Litera.

Villages
Tamarite de Litera.
Algayón.
La Melusa.

History
The town was reconquered from the Moors by Alfonso I of Aragon in 1107.

Famous natives
 Fernando Aranda, former motorcycle champion.
 Dolores Cabrera y Heredia

See also
La Franja

References

Municipalities in the Province of Huesca